Cambridge University Press is the university press of the University of Cambridge. Granted letters patent by King Henry VIII in 1534, it is the oldest university press in the world. It is also the King's Printer.

Cambridge University Press is a department of the University of Cambridge and is both an academic and educational publisher. It became part of Cambridge University Press & Assessment, following a merger with Cambridge Assessment in 2021. With a global sales presence, publishing hubs, and offices in more than 40 countries, it publishes over 50,000 titles by authors from over 100 countries. Its publishing includes more than 380 academic journals, monographs, reference works, school and university textbooks, and English language teaching and learning publications. It also publishes Bibles, runs a bookshop in Cambridge, sells through Amazon, and has a conference venues business in Cambridge at the Pitt Building and the Sir Geoffrey Cass Sports and Social Centre.

Being part of the University of Cambridge gives Cambridge University Press a non-profit status. It transfers a minimum of 30% of any annual surplus back to the University of Cambridge.

History 

Cambridge University Press is the oldest university press in the world. It originated from letters patent granted to the University of Cambridge by Henry VIII in 1534. Cambridge is one of the two privileged presses (the other being Oxford University Press). Authors published by Cambridge have included John Milton, William Harvey, Isaac Newton, Bertrand Russell, and Stephen Hawking.

University printing began in Cambridge when the first practising University Printer, Thomas Thomas, set up a printing house in 1584. The first publication was a book, Two Treatises of the Lord His Holie Supper. In 1591 the first Cambridge Bible was printed by John Legate and in 1629 Cambridge folio edition of the King James Bible was printed by Thomas and John Buck.

In July 1697, the Duke of Somerset made a loan of £200 to the university "towards the printing house and press" and James Halman, Registrary of the university, lent £100 for the same purpose.

A new home for the press, The Pitt Building, on Trumpington Street in the centre of Cambridge was completed in 1833, which was designed by Edward Blore. It became a listed building in 1950.

In the early 1800s, the press pioneers the development of stereotype printing, allowing successive printings from one setting. The press began using steam-powered machine presses by the 1850s. It was in this period that the press turned down what later became the Oxford English Dictionary – a proposal for which was brought to Cambridge by James Murray before he turned to Oxford.

The press journals publishing programme began in 1893 with the Journal of Physiology and then the Journal of Hygiene and Biometrika. By 1910 the press had become a well-established journal publisher with a successful list which includes its first humanities title, Modern Language Review. 1956 seaw the first issue of the Journal of Fluid Mechanics.

The press has published 170+ Nobel Prize winners, the first in 1895.

In 1913, the Monotype system of hot-metal mechanised typesetting was introduced at the press.

In 1949, the press opened its first international branch in New York.

The press moved to its current site in Cambridge in 1963. The mid-century modern building, University Printing House, was constructed in 1961–1963. The building was designed by Beard, Bennett, Wilkins and Partners.

In 1975, the press launched its English language teaching publishing business.

In 1981, the press moved to a new site on Shaftsbury Road. The Edinburgh Building was purpose-built with an adjoining warehouse to accommodate the press's expansion. It was built in 1979–80 by International Design and Construction. This site was sold to Cambridge Assessment in 2015 for the construction of the Triangle Building.

In 1986, the press acquired the long-established Bible and prayer-book publisher Eyre & Spottiswoode, which gave the press the ancient and unique title of The Queen's Printer.

In 1992, the press opened a bookshop at 1 Trinity Street, Cambridge, which is the oldest-known bookshop site in Britain as books have been sold there since 1581. In 2008 the shop expanded into 27 Market Hill where its specialist Education and English Language Teaching shop opened the following year. The press bookshop sells Press books as well as Cambridge souvenirs such as mugs, diaries, bags, postcards, maps.

In 1993, the Cass Centre was opened to provide sports and social facilities for employees and their families.

In 1999, Cambridge Dictionaries Online was launched.

In 2012, the press sold its printing operation to MPG Books Group and now uses third parties around the world to provide its print publications.

In 2019, the press released a new concept in scholarly publishing through Cambridge Elements where authors whose works are either too short to be printed as a book or too long to qualify as a journal article could have these published within 12 weeks.

In 2021, Cambridge University Press merged with Cambridge Assessment. The new organisation is called Cambridge University Press & Assessment.

Print and typographic heritage

People 
 John Siberch, in 1521 the first printer in Cambridge
 John Baskerville (1707–1775), the official printer; his Cambridge edition of the King James Bible (1763) is considered his masterpiece
 Bruce Rogers (1870–1957), appointed 'printing expert' at the press for two years in 1917
 Stanley Morison (1889–1967), typographical advisor both to the press and to the Monotype Corporation from 1925 to 1954 and, from 1929, also to The Times newspaper
 John Dreyfus (1918–2002), joined the press in 1939 and became Assistant Printer in 1949
 David Kindersley (1915–1995), designed a special typeface, Meliorissimo, for the press's buildings, stationery, signs and vans

Publications 
 1584: the press's first publication is a book, Two Treatises of the Lord His Holie Supper. 
 1591: the first Cambridge Bible is printed by John Legate 
 1629: Cambridge folio edition of the King James Bible is printed by Thomas and John Buck.
 1633: The Temple by George Herbert (1593 – 1633) includes "Easter Wings". The poem's words and lines are arranged on the page to create a visual image of its subject. 
 1713: the second edition of Isaac Newton's Philosophiæ Naturalis Principia Mathematica is published by the press.
 1763: John Baskerville's folio Bible, considered a masterpiece, uses his innovations with type, paper, ink, and the printing process.
 1895: the first title by a Nobel Laureate is published: J. J. Thomson's Elements of the Mathematical Theory of Electricity and Magnetism.

Current publications

Open access 
Cambridge University Press has stated its support for a sustainable transition to open access. It offers a range of open access publishing options under the heading of Cambridge Open, allowing authors to comply with the Gold Open Access and Green Open Access requirements of major research funders. It publishes Gold Open Access journals and books and works with publishing partners such as learned societies to develop Open Access for different communities. It supports Green Open Access (also called Green archiving) across its journals and monographs, allowing authors to deposit content in institutional and subject-specific repositories. It also supports sharing on commercial sharing sites through its Cambridge Core Share service.

In recent years it has entered into several Read & Publish Open Access agreements with university libraries and consortia in several countries, including a landmark agreement with the University of California. In its 2019 Annual Report, Cambridge University Press stated that it saw such agreements "as an important stepping stone in the transition to Open Access".

In 2019, the press joined with the University of Cambridge's research and teaching departments to give a unified response to Plan S, which calls for all publications resulting from publicly funded research to be published in compliant open access journals or platforms from 2020. The response emphasized Cambridge's commitment to an open access goal which works effectively for all academic disciplines, is financially sustainable for institutions and high-quality peer review, and which leads to an orderly transition.

The press is a member of the Open Access Scholarly Publishers Association and the International Association of STM Publishers.

In 2023, more than 50 per cent of Cambridge University Press research articles are in open access mode.

Nobel prize winners published by Cambridge University Press 
J. J. Thomson (Physics – 1906)
Ernest Rutherford (Chemistry – 1908)
Niels Bohr (Physics 1922)
Werner Heisenberg (Physics – 1932)
Charles Scott Sherrington (Medicine – 1932)
Erwin Schrödinger (Physics – 1935)
James Chadwick (Physics – 1935)
Patrick Blackett (Physics – 1948)
John Cockcroft (Physics – 1951)
Ernest Hemingway (Literature – 1954)
Alexander R. Todd (Chemistry – 1957)
Max Perutz (Chemistry –1962)
Eugene Wigner (Physics – 1963)
Max Born (Physics – 1964)
Nikolay Basov (Physics – 1964)
Richard Feynman (Physics – 1965)
Derek Barton (Chemistry 1969)
Samuel Beckett (Literature – 1969)
Simon Kuznets (Economics – 1971)
Dennis Gabor (Physics – 1971)
Kenneth Arrow (Economics – 1972)
Burton Richter (Physics – 1976)
James Meade (Economics – 1977)
Nevill Francis Mott (Physics – 1977)
Herbert A. Simon (Economics – 1978)
Steven Weinberg (Physics – 1979)
Abdus Salam (Physics – 1979)
James ChaSubramanyan Chandrasekhar (Physics – 1983)
Gérard Debreu (Economics – 1983)
Richard Stone (Economics – 1984)
Franco Modigliani (Economics – 1985)
James M. Buchanan (Economics – 1986)
Wole Soyinka (Literature – 1986)
Robert Solow (Economics – 1987)
Pierre-Gilles de Gennes (Physics – 1991)
Robert Fogel (Economics – 1993)
Douglass North (Economics – 1993)
Harry Kroto (Chemistry – 1996)
William Vickrey (Economics – 1996)
Claude Cohen-Tannoudji (Physics – 1997)
William Phillips (Physics – 1997)
Amartya Sen (Economics – 1998)
Gerard 't Hooft (Physics – 1999)
Martinus J. G. Veltman (Physics – 1999)
James Heckman (Economics – 2000)
George Akerlof (Economics – 2001)
Joseph Stiglitz (Economics – 2001)
Daniel Kahneman (Economics – 2002)
Vernon L. Smith (Economics – 2002)
Clive Granger (Economics – 2003)
Anthony James Leggett (Physics – 2003)
Edmund Phelps (Economics – 2006)
Leonid Hurwicz (Economics – 2007)
Intergovernmental Panel on Climate Change (Peace Prize – 2007)
Elinor Ostrom (Economics – 2009)
Thomas A. Steitz (Chemistry – 2009)
Christopher A. Pissarides (Economics – 2010)
Peter Diamond (Economics – 2010)
Christopher A. Sims (Economics – 2011)
Alvin E. Roth (Economics – 2012)
Angus Deaton (Economics – 2015)
Kip Thorne (Physics – 2017)
Joachim Frank (Chemistry – 2017)
William Nordhaus (Economics – 2018)

Organisational governance and operational structure

Relationship with the University of Cambridge 

Cambridge University Press is a non-teaching department of the University of Cambridge. The press has, since 1698, been governed by the press 'Syndics' (originally known as the 'Curators'), 18 senior members of the University of Cambridge who, along with other non-executive directors, bring a range of subject and business expertise. The Chair of the Syndicate is currently Professor Stephen Toope (Vice-Chancellor of the University of Cambridge). The Syndicate has delegated its powers to a Press & Assessment Board; and to an Academic Publishing Committee and an English Language Teaching & Education Publishing Committee.

The Press & Assessment Board is responsible for setting overarching strategic direction. The Publishing Committees provide quality assurance and formal approval of the publishing strategy.

The operational responsibility of the press is delegated by the Syndics to the Secretary of the Syndicate and Chief Executive.

In 2020 the university announced its decision to merge Cambridge University Press with Cambridge Assessment.

Operational structure 
Until August 2021, Cambridge University Press had three publishing groups:

 Academic Publishing: publishes research books and journals in science, technology, medicine, humanities, and the social sciences. It also publishes advanced learning materials and reference content as well as 380 journals, of which 43 are ‘Gold’ Open Access. Open Access articles now account for 15 per cent of articles. The group also publishes Bibles, and the press is one of only two publishers entitled to publish the Book of Common Prayer and the King James Version of the Bible in England.
 English Language Teaching: publishes English language teaching courses and resources for learners of all ages around the world. It offers a suite of integrated learning and assessment tools underpinned by the Cambridge Curriculum, a systematic approach to learning and evaluating proficiency in English. It works closely with Cambridge Assessment through the joint initiative Cambridge Exams Publishing.
 Education: delivers educational products, services and software for primary, secondary and international schools. It collaborates with Cambridge Assessment and the University of Cambridge Faculty of Education to help countries such as Kazakhstan and Oman to improve their education systems. It also works with Cambridge Assessment to reach more schools and develop new products and services that improve teaching and learning. This area is merging with the schools team at Cambridge Assessment
From 1 August 2021 onwards, Cambridge University Press became solely the academic and bible publishing division of Cambridge University Press & Assessment. With the English and education arms of the organisation forming new, merged divisions with the equalivalent departments of Cambridge Assessment.

Cambridge University Press partnerships and acquisitions 
 2011, formed a partnership with Cambridge Assessment to publish official Cambridge preparation materials for Cambridge English and IELTS examinations.
 2015, formed a strategic content and technology partnership with Edmodo, the world's most extensive e-learning platform for primary and secondary teachers and pupils, to bring premier educational content and technology to schools in the United Kingdom. 
 2017, the University of Cambridge announced that Cambridge University Press and Cambridge Assessment would work more closely in future under governance by the Press & Assessment Board.
 2019, with Cambridge Assessment English acquired the Centre for Evaluation and Monitoring from Durham. CEM provides assessments to measure learner progress and potential, as well as 11 Plus exams for many UK independent and grammar schools.
 2020, partnered with EDUCATE Ventures, the University College London edtech accelerator, to better understand the challenges and successes of home education during the lockdown.
 2020, partnered with online library Perlego to offer students access to digital textbooks.
 2020, the University Cambridge announced it would create a 'new unified organization' by merging Cambridge University Press and Cambridge Assessment, to launch 1 August 2021.
 2021, Cambridge Assessment and Cambridge University Press formally became one organisation under the name Cambridge University Press & Assessment.

Digital developments 

In 2011, Cambridge University Press adopted SAP. Cambridge University Press works closely with IT services firm Tech Mahindra on SAP, and with Cognizant and Wipro on other systems.

In 2016, Cambridge Books Online and Cambridge Journals Online were replaced by Cambridge Core - a single platform to access its publishing. It provided significantly enhanced interfaces and upgraded navigation capabilities, as well as article-level and chapter-level content selection. A year after Cambridge Core went live, the press launched Cambridge Core Share, functionality to allow users to generate and share links with free access to selected journal articles, an early sign of the press's commitment to open research.

In 2020, partnered with online library Perlego to offer students access to digital textbooks.

In 2021, the press acquired CogBooks. The technology adapts and responds to users, "recommending course material needed to optimise learning".

In 2021 the press began migrating its website onto Drupal.

Controversies

Tax exemption controversy 

In May 1940, CUP applied to the Inland Revenue for the exemption of its printing and publishing profits from taxation, equivalent to charitable status. After a November 1940 Inland Revenue hearing, CUP's application was refused "on the ground that, since the Press was printing and publishing for the outside world and not simply for the internal use of the University, the Press's trade went beyond the purpose and objects of the University and (in terms of the Act) was not exercised in the course of the actual carrying out of a primary purpose of the University". In November 1975, with CUP facing financial collapse, CUP's chief executive Geoffrey Cass wrote a 60-page "preliminary letter" to the Inland Revenue again seeking tax-exemption. A year later Cass's application was granted in a letter from the Inland Revenue, though the decision was not made public. After consulting CUP, Cambridge's 'sister' press, the giant Oxford University Press presented their own submission and received similar exemption. In 2003 OUP's tax-exemption was publicly attacked by Joel Rickett of The Bookseller in The Guardian. In 2007, with the new 'public benefit' requirement of the revised Charities Act, the issue was re-examined  with particular reference to the OUP.<ref>Tom Tivnan (2007). "Charities review could hit publishers". '"The Bookseller.</ref> In 2008 CUP's and OUP's privilege was attacked by rival publishers.  In 2009 The Guardian invited author Andrew Malcolm to write an article on the subject.

 Alms for Jihad 

In 2007, controversy arose over the press's decision to destroy all remaining copies of its 2006 book Alms for Jihad: Charity and Terrorism in the Islamic World, by Burr and Collins, as part of the settlement of a lawsuit brought by Saudi billionaire Khalid bin Mahfouz. Within hours, Alms for Jihad became one of the 100 most sought after titles on Amazon.com and eBay in the United States. The press sent a letter to libraries asking them to remove copies from circulation. The press subsequently sent out copies of an "errata" sheet for the book.

The American Library Association issued a recommendation to libraries still holding Alms for Jihad: "Given the intense interest in the book, and the desire of readers to learn about the controversy first hand, we recommend that U.S. libraries keep the book available for their users." The publisher's decision did not have the support of the book's authors and was criticized by some who claimed it was incompatible with freedom of speech and with freedom of the press and that it indicated that English defamation laws were excessively strict. In the New York Times Book Review (7 October 2007), United States Congressman Frank R. Wolf described Cambridge's settlement as "basically a book burning". The press pointed out that, at that time, it had already sold most of its copies of the book.

The press defended its actions, saying it had acted responsibly and that it is a global publisher with a duty to observe the laws of many different countries.

Cambridge University Press v. Patton

In this case, originally filed in 2008, CUP et al. accused Georgia State University of infringement of copyright. The case closed on 29 September 2020, with GSU as the prevailing party.

 The China Quarterly 
On 18 August 2017, following an "instruction" from a Chinese import agency, Cambridge University Press used the functionality that had been built into Cambridge Core to temporarily delete politically sensitive articles from The China Quarterly on its Chinese website. The articles focused on topics China regards as taboo, including the 1989 Tiananmen Square massacre, Mao Zedong's Cultural Revolution, Hong Kong's fight for democracy, and ethnic tensions in Xinjiang and Tibet. On 21 August 2017, in the face of growing international protests, Cambridge University Press announced it would immediately repost the articles to uphold the principle of academic freedom on which the university's work is founded.

 The Cambridge Handbook of Privatization 
In February 2021, the forthcoming Cambridge Handbook of Privatization was found to have included a chapter by John Mark Ramseyer in which he described Koreans murdered in the Kantō Massacre as "gangs" that "torched buildings, planted bombs, [and] poisoned water supplies". Editors Avihay Dorfman and Alon Harel acknowledged the historical distortions of the chapter, but gave Ramseyer a chance to revise. Harel described the inclusion of the original chapter as an "innocent and very regrettable" mistake on the part of the editors.

 Corporate social responsibility 

 Community 
The press undertakes community engagement in Cambridge and around the world where there are Press employees. Annually, the press selects a UK Charity of the Year, which has included local charities Centre 33 (2016 and 2017), Rowan Humberstone (2018), and Castle School (2019). In 2016, some of the press's community works included its continued support to Westchester Community College in New York, the installation of hygienic facilities in an Indonesian rural school, raising funds to rehabilitate earthquake-stricken schools in Nepal, and guiding students from Coleridge Community College, Cambridge in a CV workshop. On World Book Day 2016, the press held a digital Shakespeare publishing workshop for students and their teachers. Similarly, their Indian office conducted a workshop for teachers and students in 17 schools in Delhi to learn the whole process of book publishing. The press donated more than 75,000 books in 2016.

An apprenticeship program for people interested in careers in publishing was established in 2016 by 2022 it had 200 active apprenices in the UK in a wide range of roles.

 Environment 
The press monitors its emissions annually, has converted to energy-saving equipment, minimizes plastic use and ensures that their paper is sourced ethically.

In 2019, the World Wildlife Fund awarded its highest score to the press of Three Trees, based on the press's timber purchasing policy, performance statement and its responsible sourcing of timber. The press works hard to minimise the number of books that are sent for pulping each year.

The press won the Independent Publishers Guild Independent Publishing Awards for sustainability in 2020 and in 2021. Its public commitments to sustainability include being a signatory of the UN Global Compact and to the goals of the Cambridge Zero initiative run by the University of Cambridge – to being carbon zero on all energy-related emissions by 2048.

 References 
 Citations 

 Sources 

 Anonymous; The Student's Guide to the University of Cambridge. Third Edition, Revised and Partly Re-written; Deighton Bell, 1874 (reissued by Cambridge University Press, 2009)
 Anonymous; War Record of the Cambridge University Press 1914–1919; Cambridge University Press, 1920; (reissued by Cambridge University Press, 2009)
 A History of Cambridge University Press, Volume 1: Printing and the Book Trade in Cambridge, 1534–1698; McKitterick, David; 1992; 
 A History of Cambridge University Press, Volume 2: Scholarship and Commerce, 1698–1872; McKitterick, David; 1998; 
 A History of Cambridge University Press, Volume 3: New Worlds for Learning, 1873–1972; McKitterick, David; 1998; 
 A Short History of Cambridge University Press; Black, Michael; 2000; 

External links 

 A Brief History of Cambridge University Press

 
1534 establishments in England
Press
Book publishing companies of the United Kingdom
University presses of the United Kingdom
Companies based in Cambridge
Shops in Cambridge
Organizations established in the 1530s
Publishing companies established in the 16th century